Mar Thomas Tharayil( born 2 February 1972) is the auxiliary bishop of Syro-Malabar Archeparchy of Changanacherry. He was conferred as the auxiliary bishop by Mar Joseph Perumthottam on 23 April 2017.

Early life 
Thomas Joseph Tharayil, born on 2 February 1972, is the youngest son among the seven children of T. J. Joseph and Mariamma at Changanacherry, Kottayam district, Kerala. He attended St Mary's Metropolitan Church, Changanacherry. He had his primary education in St Joseph's L. P. School, Changanassery, and his high school education at Sacred Heart English Medium School, Fathimapuram, completing his pre-degree course at St Berchmans College, Changanassery.

He then joined the minor seminary of Changanacherry Archeparchy, St Thomas Minor Seminary, Kurichy, for priestly formation. He completed his philosophical and  theological studies in St Thomas Apostolic Seminary, Vadavathoor. He was ordained priest  by Mar Joseph Powathil on 1 January 2000, the Great Jubilee Year, at St Mary's Metropolitan Church, Changanacherry.

Priestly life 
Tharayil served as assistant vicar in  Athirampuzha (2000), Nedumkunnam (2001) and Koilmuck-Edathua (2003). He served at Thazhathuvadakara as vicar in the year 2004.

He did doctoral studies in Psychology from Pontifical Gregorian University (2004-2011). After his doctorate in Rome he was appointed as the Director of Dhanahalaya, Institute of Formation and Counselling, Punnapra, Alappuzha, in 2011. He served as visiting professor to St Thomas Apostolic Seminary, Vadavathoor, National Vocation Service Centre, Pune Dharmaram Vidya Kshetram and Institute of Formators, Bengaluru.

Auxiliary bishop 
The synod of bishops of the Syro-Malabar Church, held at Kakkanad Mount St Thomas, elected Fr Thomas Tharayil (Tomy) as auxiliary bishop of the Changanassery archdiocese on 14 January 2017. He was conferred as the auxiliary bishop by Mar Joseph Perumthottam on 23 April 2017. Pope Francis assigned to the Auxiliary Bishop-Elect the Titular See of Agrippia. The southern part of the Changanacherry Archeparchy consisting of Thiruvananthapuram, Kollam and Amboori Foranes is under the attention of Mar Thomas Tharayil.

On 20 October 2020 there was a hunger strike protest by three bishops of Catholic Church, Bishop Joshua Mar Ignathios of Mavelikkara, chairman of the Kerala Bishops' Council (KCBC) Education Commission, its vice-chairman, Bishop Paul Anthony Mullassery of Kollam and Auxiliary Bishop Thomas Tharayil of Changanassery, against the government  for educational rights. Archbishop Soosa Pakiam said that in the last five years, the government has not distributed its promised aid to over 3,000 teachers in Catholic schools.

References 

Syro-Malabar Catholic Archeparchy of Changanassery
Syro-Malabar bishops
1972 births
Living people